Walter Harris Ratcliff, Jr. (1881–1978) was an English-born American architect, active in Berkeley, California. His work includes local landmarks and buildings listed on the National Register of Historic Places. He served as Berkeley's first city architect for part of his career and is credited with helping develop the first zoning regulations in the state.

Biography 
Ratcliff was born in London and came to the United States in 1894. Lilian Bridgman worked as a draftsperson in his office.

He partnered for a short time with John Galen Howard. He also worked with Alfred Henry Jacobs (as Ratcliff & Jacobs). 

Ratcliff designed the John J. Cairns House at 2729 Elmwood Avenue, Walter Keane and his wife Barbara Keane lived in it. He also designed Armstrong College (Berkeley)'s Ratcliff building at 2222 Harold Way. Named for the architect it is a Berkeley landmark. He designed the Charles W. Merrill House (1938) for mining engineer and San Francisco businessman Charles Washington Merrill. It is listed on the National Register. He is one of the noted architects with buildings in Panoramic Hill, Oakland/Berkeley, California. He was one of the architects who designed buildings for Mills College. He designed Hillside Elementary School (1928), a building listed on the National Register. Converted to a residence, it is on the List of largest houses in the United States.

Walter Ratcliff retired in 1955. His son, Robert W. Ratcliff, and later his grandson also became architects and kept the firm he started in business.

List of buildings

National Register of Historic Places 
The buildings he designed that are listed on the National Register include:

Anna Head School for Girls, 2538 Channing Way, Berkeley, California
Berkeley Day Nursery (1927), 2031 6th Street, Berkeley, California
Chamber of Commerce Building, 2140–2144 Shattuck Avenue & 2071–2089 Center Street, Berkeley, California
Hillside School (1928), 1581 Leroy Avenue, Berkeley, California
Charles W. Merrill House (1938), 407 Camino Sobrante, Orinda, California

Other buildings 

Several homes in the Piedmont, California–area
Mason-McDuffie Building at 2102 Shattuck Avenue, Berkeley, California
Wells Fargo Bank, 2959 College Ave, Berkeley, California at College Avenue and Ashby Avenue
John Jolly Cairns House (1910), 2729 Elmwood Avenue, Berkeley, California
Elks Club (1913; more recently Scandinavian Designs), 2018 Allston Way, Berkeley, California
Channing Apartments (1913), 2409 College Avenue, Berkeley, California
Malcolm X Elementary School (1920; formerly Lincoln School), 1731 Prince St, Berkeley, California
Armstrong College (1923), 2210 Harold Way, Berkeley, California
Chamber of Commerce building (1925) (later Wells Fargo), 12-stories, Berkeley's first and only skyscraper until 1970
Westminster House (1926), 2700 Bancroft Way, Berkeley, California
Church Divinity School of the Pacific (1929), All Saints Chapel, Gibbs Hall, 2449 Ridge Road, Berkeley, California
Brick gas station (c. 1930s), 1952 Oxford Street, Berkeley, California, a city-designated landmark, scheduled for demolition 2021
Berkeley Baptist Divinity School, the chapel (1949) and academic buildings (1963), 2606 Dwight Way, Berkeley, California
Pacific School of Religion buildings including Holbrook Hall at 1708 Scenic Avenue, Berkeley, California

References

External links
Ratcliff Architects website
Walter H. Ratcliff architectural specifications and drawings, 1914-1959, at Bancroft Library, University of California, Berkeley

1881 births
1978 deaths
20th-century American architects
English emigrants to the United States
Architects from London
Architects from California